Timir Biswas (born 20 November 1982) is an Indian playback singer of both Bengali and Hindi films . He also the lead singer of the band Fakira. He originates from Sreepally, Asansol, West Bengal and belongs to a Bengali family.

Early life
Timir was born on 20 November 1982 to parents Swapan Biswas and Sukla Biswas. His father Swapan Biswas is a theatre actor and a bank employee. Timir completed his education from Subhas Pally Vidya Niketan and then joined Raghunathpur College, Purulia with economics.

Timir has never taken any formal training in music. When he was four to five years old he used to sing the ad jingles shown on television. On seeing this his mother took him to her Guruji, but Timir's singing was not encouraged. It was said that he could never sing with such a voice.

Then on the first day of college, he first sang publicly when he was asked to do so by some of his seniors. Everyone liked it. And then this became a daily routine. From then he started singing. He has learnt music by listening to songs. He used to go to many music persons with his compositions and lyrics but no one encouraged him. Then he got a chance to open a gig for a concert of Nachiketa Chakraborty. His performance was praised by Nachiketa. Then he formed and joined the band Muzik Street. After few small gigs, they got selected for Band-e-mataram. Chandrabindoo's Anindya and Upal were the mentor of Muzik Street in the event. Later Upal called up Timir to sing for the film 033. Since then, he took up music as a profession.

Muzik Street
Timir was one of the founding members of the Asansol-based band Muzik Street. He initially played the keyboard, and later as a vocalist. Later he left the band and shifted to Kolkata. Muzik Street brought the band revolution in Asansol. Timir, for his unique voice got noticed by several music directors. It was during this time that he did his first solo playback under the music direction of Chandrabindoo for the song "Onnyo Kothao Chol" of the movie 033. Later he got his wide fame and popularity when under the music direction of Jeet Ganguly, he along with Rana Mazumdar sang the title track of the movie "Dui Prithibi". Thereafter he got numerous offers for playback.

Fakira
After leaving Muzik Street, Timir shifted to Kolkata owing to the various offers for playback and other solo works as it was difficult for him to continue working from Asansol. There he met with one of his friend from Asansol, guitarist, composer and a member of the band Desh, Chayan Chakraborty. Their alike interest in Folk Music led them into working more with folk songs. Gradually Abhinaba, Kunaal and the famous percussionist, drummer Bunty joined them to form the band Fakira. They are currently working with Bengali folks and has plans to work on root music round the globe.

The current line up is :

Timir Biswas: Vocals and Keyboard
Chayan Chakraborty: Guitar and Backing Vocals
Apurba Das: Guitar
Kunaal Biswas: Bass and Backing Vocals
Avirup Das (Bunty): Drums and Percussion

After visiting various ashrams and akhras they have started their research in folk songs and have blended them with elements of rock. Some of their folk arrangements has already gained immense popularity online. Some of them are Chander Gaye Chand, Nizamuddin Auliya, Tyangra, Golemale Pirit, Somoy Gele Shadhon, and Bhromor Koyo Giya. They have toured Bangladesh to feature in an Eid Special 4-hour-long episode of Air Wick Phono Live Studio Concert in ETV. Other than this they have performed at various college fests and other notable social events. Timir, Chayan and Abhinaba have also worked for music of the 4th Bell Theaters production 15 Minutes To Fame & Nobel Chor. In 2013 October, Fakira went international and performed at Hartford, Columbus, Tampa and Chicago.

In July 2015, Fakira featured in Caller Gaan in Desh TV, a popular TV channel of Bangladesh.

Itorpona 
Fakira released their debut album Itorpona on 6 September 2014 at Story, Elgin Road, Kolkata marked by the gracious presence of Sayani Datta, Sujoyprasad Chattopadhyay, Satrajit Sen, Aakash Fakir and Armaan Fakir. The album released under the banner of Inreco and Major 7th consists of 8 tracks written by Lalon Fakir, Radharomon, Hasan and others. The song titled Somoy Gele Shadhon is a tribute to Pink Floyd and is a bridge between Lalon and Pink Floyd. Itorpona has won the Special Jury Award in Mirchi Music Awards Bangla, 2015. The album contains the following tracks:
Bhromor Koyo Giya
Paal Tule De
Itorpona
Somoy Gele Shadhon
Chander Gaye Chand Legeche
Nizammuddin Auliya
Opaar
Sob Loke Koy Lalon

Hare Krishno 
The band has recently announced on social media that they have started working on their second album which is to be titled Hare Krishno. Recordings have reportedly begun for the album at Yash Raj Film Studios Mumbai.

Also, the band is coming up with two singles - Krishno Premer Pora Deho and Ami Shudhu Roinu baki which will be releasing soon. As per the band, the recordings have been done. As of now, the post production works are being carried out.

Playback & Television

Timir because of his unique quality of voice, got noted by music directors quite early. Jeet Ganguly in an interview said that Timir is the Bryan Adams of Bengal. After "onnyo kothao chol" from 033, music by Chandrabindoo and "Dui Prithibi" from Dui Prithibi, Music by Jeet Ganguly, Timir has also sung for music directors like Indradeep Dasgupta, Joy Sarkar. He has recently made his Bollywood debut in the film 'Khajoor Pe Atke' directed by Harsh Chhaya

Timir Biswas has also been featured in Zee Bangla Cinema Song connection and has been accredited for the maximum number of songs in the show.

Timir Biswas Live (TBL)
On 17 June 2015 Timir for the first time went solo on stage. On the eve of the anniversary celebration of 4th Bell Theaters, the theatre group organized the show Timir Biswas Live (TBL) at Gyan Manch. It was the first time where Timir performed his playback numbers live in a concert. The show witnessed many popular faces of the Bengali film and music industry viz. Chaitali Dasgupta, Ujjaini, Satadal and Gabu. Praises showered in for Timir post the show. 
Henceforth TBL has been immensely popular and has performed in numerous concerts in college fests etc.

Timir Biswas Live features:
 Timir Biswas - Vocals & Guitar
 Chayan Chakraborty - Lead Guitar
 Sagar Chatterjee - Lead Guitar
 Mohul Chakraborty (Dodo) - Bass Guitar
 Rahul - Keyboard
 Appu - Drums

Ondho Premik
Timir, after posting a series of 17 social media posts containing couplets of lyrics, announced that Ondho Premik his first Solo album would be coming soon to the audience. On 3 August, Timir revealed the details about the album on social media. Ondho Premik as  cited by Timir is supposed to contain 6 love stories in form of 6 songs. The lyrics are penned by Rajib Chakraborty. Ashu-Abhishek composed the music for the album.

Ashu-Abhishek (a well known music director duo) and Timir have known each other for four years and have worked on various projects including Zee Bangla Song Connection, but almost all of them were client based. However, all of them had an urge to work on an album independently, with their own understanding and expression of music. However, things kept on getting pushed and nothing was actually taking shape. They had initially arranged many sittings to discuss the same, but little did anything fruitful turn out.

The entire team of Ondho Premik first got together for a show called Poetry on Celluloid hosted by a popular RJ of Kolkata, Raja Das. They created a song titled Bhalobashar Jawr (penned by Rajib Chakraborty) for that show. With this song, they realized that Bhalobashar Jawr was the kind of songs that they actually wanted to work on. With this, the decision to work on an album together, was taken unanimously. They decided to meet at Rajib's place.

As usual, like the earlier meetings, Ashu and Timir were not aware of what was going to take shape from this meeting. Abhishek was out of town when this meeting took place. However, at the meeting they find out that Rajib has already written 8 songs for the album and all of them were production ready content. At this point of time, other members of the team became serious and work on the album began.

Yet Ondho Premik was not progressing ahead as Ashu-Abhishek were stuck in their other projects. Finally one fine night, accompanied by heavy downpour, the duo created the first track of the album Bandhobi Mon. Henceforth, after various sittings, planning etc. the team finally hit the studios on 25 August 2016 and finished recording on 6 September 2016. The Drums have been played by a friend of Ashu, Vinayak Mahadevan and was recorded by Jonathan at The Sound House Studio in California. The album was recorded at Sonic Solutions (vocals) and Post Production (music), Kolkata. The album was mixed by a close friend of Timir, Shubhodeep, in Mumbai.

The album released (first time for a Bengali album to pre-release on digital media) on digital platforms on 15 October 2016 through a Facebook live session. The album (released by Inreco) release will be held at Princeton Club on 27 October accompanied by a special performance by Fakira. The album consists of the following six tracks:

 Chole Bole Koushole
 Ondho Premik
 Bandhobimon
 Niruddesh
 Bhalobashar Jwor
 Ekshow Aath

On 19 November 2016 the Music video for Ondho Premik was released on YouTube by Indian Records Video Channel. The video, produced in association with the 4th Bell Theaters, has already garnered more than 50,000 views. The video directed by Aniruddha Dasgupta and edited and colored by Alok Chowdhury, features Timir, Ashu, Abhishek, Rajib, Chayan, Sagar, Prarthita, Mahua, Aritra, Ritwick, Satyaki, Asim, Shreya, Dipanwita and Kallol. The post production activities were carried out by Kolkata Videos.

YouTube Covers
Timir featured in a number of covers which released on YouTube under the banners of Kolkata Videos HD, 12 Keys Studio etc. His first cover of the song Pyar Deewana Hota Hai from film Kati Patang was released in 2014 by Kolkata Videos HD. The video was eventually re-released by Saregama India Ltd. Hindi music channel "Saregama GenY". Other covers include Iktara (12 Keys Studio), O meri Jaan (12 Keys Studio), Ei meghla dine ekla (Kolkata Videos HD), etc.

Director and Story Teller

The knack of story telling lingered within Timir since his childhood days. According to Timir, his inspiration for storytelling is his father. Timir ventured into Direction and Story Telling with the musical short film Kichudin - a  song penned by Soumik Das (who also happens to be the DOP for the film) and sung by Timir. Kichudin talks about love and life in old age homes. Timir's father Swapan Biswas plays a pivotal role in the film.

Following the success of Kichudin, Timir directed another music video/ musical short film for a cover version of the Rabinra Sangeet Tumi Robe Nirobe sung by Timir himself with Rahul Sarkar on the Keys. The entire footage for the film was shot on Timir's iPhone while the band was in Jalpaiguri.

Timir's third venture is the Musical Short Film for the song Ami Jani Tumi Thik by the band Bad Trip. Timir has written the story and directed film. The film talks about getting over our mistakes and starting out afresh. Timir's father Swapan Biswas has played the role of the protagonists father in the film.

Theater
Timir's father Swapan Biswas has been associated with theater for more than 35 years. He has performed in numerous shows in Asansol and various parts of West Bengal, Delhi etc. Timir, watching his father perform was intrigued by this form of art and had developed a liking for the art as early as his toddler age. Timir too has been associated with theater and stage plays since his childhood. Timir is associated with one of the most famous theater groups of Kolkata, called 4th Bell Theaters for more than 4 years. For numerous plays viz. Noble Chor, 15 Minutes to Fame, Fan staged by the group, Timir has been an active member in producing the music. Timir has also performed on stage for many of the plays.

Discography
Director

Muzik Street

Fakira (Live)

Playback

Films

Television and others

Awards
Special Award for Nabagato Kantho, 91.9 Friends FM Sangeet Samman 2013

Special Jury Award for Itorpona, Mirchi Music Awards Bangla, 2015

References 

1982 births
Living people
Bengali singers
Singers from West Bengal
Indian male singer-songwriters
Indian singer-songwriters
People from Asansol